Stonefield may refer to:
 Stonefield (band), an Australian Psychedelic rock band
Stonefield (album) studio album by the band
 Stonefield Castle, also known as Barmore House, 17th century manor house in Scotland
Stonefield, a neighbourhood in Blantyre, South Lanarkshire
 Stonefield (Charlottesville, Virginia), historic home built about 1860
 Stonefield (Wisconsin), an 1868 mansion in Wisconsin on the U.S. National Register of Historic Places
 Steinfeld, South Australia, an Australian place known as Stonefield between 1918 and 1986
 Stonefield Beach State Recreation Site in Oregon, USA